La Notizia is an Italian newspaper which was started by Gaetano Pedullà, an Italian journalist and politician, and other journalists  in 2013. The paper is headquartered in Rome. Gaetano Pedullà is the editor-in-chief of the paper.

References

External links
 

2013 establishments in Italy
Italian-language newspapers
Newspapers established in 2013
Newspapers published in Rome